Pipkin (also known as Malpais Crater) is a volcano in California, with activity during the Quaternary. The surface of erupted lava flows is weathered, and argon-argon dating and potassium-argon dating has yielded ages of 770,000 ± 40,000 and  600,000 years before present, respectively.

The volcano lies in the Rodman Mountains. The cone itself consists of lava bombs and scoria with red and black colours. Lava flows from the vent propagated through Kane Wash and into the Mojave River valley; it is possible that the lava diverted part of the wash into neighbouring Sheep Springs Wash.

The cone is the site of a quarry. Pipkin was mined since the 1950s for its ash.

References

Sources 

 
 

Volcanoes of San Bernardino County, California
Pleistocene volcanoes